Mambalam taluk is a taluk of the city district of Chennai in the Indian state of Tamil Nadu. It was formed in December 2013 from parts of the former Egmore-Nungambakkam taluk and the Mambalam-Guindy taluk. It comprises the neighbourhoods of K. K. Nagar, Kodambakkam, Mambalam, Saligramam, Saidapet and Virugambakkam.

References

General
 Taluks of Chennai district

Specific

Taluks of Chennai district